Javier Boñar Franco (born 3 June 2005) is a Spanish professional footballer currently playing as a centre-back for Atlético Madrid B.

Club career
Born in Madrid, Boñar started his career as a midfielder with local side Club Deportivo Metropolitano, listing former Brazilian international Kaká as one of his idols growing up. After moving to Atlético de Madrid in 2013, he transitioned to a central defender, and took to his new position well - playing at a youth level higher than his peers.

For the 2022–23 season, he was promoted to Atlético's B team, making his debut in a 4–2 Segunda Federación win against Atlético Paso.

International career
Boñar has represented Spain at youth international level.

Career statistics

Club

Notes

References

2005 births
Living people
Footballers from Madrid
Spanish footballers
Spain youth international footballers
Association football defenders
Segunda Federación players
Atlético Madrid footballers
Atlético Madrid B players